Gunnar Dahl (24 December 1900 – 31 January 1940) was a Norwegian footballer. He played in four matches for the Norway national football team from 1924 to 1927.

References

External links
 

1900 births
1940 deaths
Norwegian footballers
Norway international footballers
People from Horten
Association football forwards
FK Ørn-Horten players